Daniel A. Greenberg (28 September 1934 – 2 December 2021), was one of the founders of the Sudbury Valley School, has published several books on the Sudbury model of school organization, and was described by Sudbury Valley School trustee Peter Gray as the "principal philosopher" among its founders. He was a physics professor at Columbia University, and was described by Lois Holzman as the school's "chief 'philosophical writer'".

Publications

Books
 1964, Anaxagoras and the Birth of Physics with Daniel E. Gershenson, OCLC 899834
 1973, Announcing a New School: A Personal Account of the Beginnings of the Sudbury Valley School, 
 1974, Outline of a New Philosophy, 
 1987, Child Rearing, 
 1988, Early lessons : some recollections of my youth and what it taught me, 
 1991, Free at Last: The Sudbury Valley School, 
 1992, The Sudbury Valley School Experience with Hanna Greenberg, Michael Greenberg, Laura Ransom, Mimsy Sadofsky and Alan White, 
 1992, Legacy of Trust, Life After the Sudbury Valley School Experience with Mimsy Sadofsky, 
 1992, A New Look at Schools, 
 1992, Education in America: A View from Sudbury Valley, 
 1994, Worlds in Creation, 
 1994, Kingdom of Childhood, Growing Up At Sudbury Valley School with Mimsy Sadofsky and Hanna Greenberg, 
 1995, Sudbury Valley School Handbook, 
 1998, Starting a Sudbury School: A Summary of the Experiences of Fifteen Start-Up Groups with Mimsy Sadofsky, 
 1999, Reflections on the Sudbury School Concept with Mimsy Sadofsky, 
 2000, A Clearer View: New Insights into the Sudbury School Model, 
 2004, The Pursuit of Happiness: The Lives of Sudbury Valley Alumni with Mimsy Sadofsky and Jason Lempka, 
 2008, Turning Learning Right Side Up: Putting Education Back on Track with Russell L. Ackoff, .
 2016, A Place to Grow: The Culture of Sudbury Valley School, .
 2018, America at Risk: How Schools Undermine Our Country's Core Values, .
 2018, Constructing reality: The Most Creative of All the Arts,.
Chapters
 1994, "Democratic to the Core: Life in Sudbury Valley School", in The Handbook of Alternative Education.

Papers
 1960, Theory of Allowed and Forbidden Transitions in Muon Capture Reactions. II, with Masato Morita, in Physical Review, 119, pp. 435–437.
 1960, Theory of the Hyperfine Anomalies of Deuterium, Tritium, and Helium-3+, with Henry M. Foley, in Physical Review, 120, pp. 1684–1697.
 1987, Idea Notebook: Teaching Justice through Experience, in Journal of Experiential Education, 10(1), pp. 46–47.

Articles
 1991, Learning without coercion: Sudbury Valley School in Mothering, 58, pp. 102–105.
 1985-1992, regular column in the Middlesex News on education in America.

References

External links
Interview with Daniel Greenberg (2001)

1934 births
2021 deaths
Columbia University faculty
20th-century American educators
21st-century American educators
American education writers
20th-century American male writers
20th-century American non-fiction writers
21st-century American male writers
21st-century American non-fiction writers
American male non-fiction writers